The German Combat Games were a national multi-sport event established in 1922 by the Deutscher Reichsausschuss für Leibesübungen under Carl Diem.

Deutsche Kampfspiele 

The events lasted from 1922 to 1934. According to Diem the games should promote "German art, German song and German Volksgemeinschaft". In 1938 they were replaced by the Deutsches Turn- und Sportfest 1938.

A documentary film was made of the 1922 games, Die deutschen Kampfspiele 1922, produced by Arnold Fanck. A two part documentary Zweite Deutsche Kampfspiele. 1. Tag and Zweite Deutsche Kampfspiele. 2. Tag was produced for the second.

NS-Kampspiele 
During the Nazi regime, the fighting games continued as NS-fighting games. Since Germany had been allowed to participate in the Olympics since 1928, these games were no longer to be understood as a counter-movement to the Olympic idea, but rather as a propaganda platform for the regime. When, in 1935, the international boycott movement against the Olympic Games in Berlin in 1936 grew markedly, the replacement of German combat games in Berlin was Plan B of the Reichssportführer. On the order of Adolf Hitler on November 30, 1936, these games were held during the Reichsparteitage in Nuremberg from 1937 to 1938, with regional preliminary decisions for the main games. In addition to the NSDAP, the SA, SS, NSKK and HJ also participated in the predominantly military sports competitions, such as hand grenade targets, 30-meter swimming in a drizzle suit with a pack or 15-kilometer baggage in closed formations Wehrmacht and the police. The SA had the responsibility for these paramilitary events. The outbreak of war in 1939 ended the short episode of the NS combat games. A documentary was made of the 1937 edition of these games.

Games

Summer Games 
1922 - June 18 to July 2 in Berlin
1926 - July 4 to July 11 in Cologne
1930 - June 26 to June 29 in Breslau
1934 - June 23 to June 29 in Nürnberg

Winter Games

1922 - January 23 to January 29 in Garmisch-Partenkirchen in Upper Bavaria
1926 - January 23 to January 31 in Triberg im Schwarzwald 
1930 - January 11 to January 19 in Krummhübel on Riesengebirge
1934 in Schierke in Harz

NS-Kampfspiele 
1937 in Nürnberg 
1938 in Nürnberg

References

External links 
 NS-Kampfspiele 1937 - film of the 1937 edition

National multi-sport events
Sporting events in Germany
Recurring sporting events established in 1922
Recurring events disestablished in 1934
1922 establishments in Germany
1934 disestablishments in Germany